Jennifer Marie Rizzotti (born May 15, 1974) is a retired American collegiate and professional basketball player, and former Division I coach at George Washington University. She is the president of the Connecticut Sun. Rizzotti was inducted into the Women's Basketball Hall of Fame in 2013.

High school
Rizzotti attended New Fairfield High School in New Fairfield, Connecticut.
The basketball court at the New Fairfield town park was named after Rizzotti in honor of her achievements. 
She also attended ASIJ in Tokyo, Japan.

College
From 1992 to 1996, she was one of the stars of the women's basketball team at the University of Connecticut.  She was the starting point guard on the Huskies first national championship team in 1995, which recorded a perfect season, winning all 35 games. Rizzotti's picture was on the cover of Sports Illustrated magazine in recognition of the perfect season.  Jen was awarded the prestigious Honda-Broderick Cup for 1995–96, presented to the athlete "most deserving of recognition as the Collegiate Woman Athlete of the Year." She was named the 1996 Associated Press Player of the Year. 
Rizzotti was a member of the inaugural class of inductees to the University of Connecticut women's basketball "Huskies of Honor" recognition program. Rizzotti won the Frances Pomeroy Naismith Award during the 1995–96 basketball season. This award is given to the best women's basketball player in the country under 5'6' tall. During the 1995–96 season Jennifer set school records for assists with 212 and steals with 112.  Jennifer graduated with a degree in biology.

Sports Illustrated did a series of thirteen photographs featuring players on teams that were chasing or achieved undefeated seasons. The cover photo of Jennifer Rizzoti racing upcourt is one of the photos in the collection.

USA Basketball – player
Rizzotti was invited to be a member of the Jones Cup team representing the US in 1996. She helped the team to a 9–0 record, and the gold medal in the event. Rizzotti averaged 2.6 points per games, while recording 26 assists, highest on the team.

Awards and honors
 1993—Big East Co-Rookie of the Year
 1996—Wade Trophy
 1996—Associated Press Women's College Basketball Player of the Year
 1996—Winner of the Honda Sports Award for basketball
 1996—The Honda-Broderick Cup winner for all sports.
 2013 – Inducted into the Women's Basketball Hall of Fame

Professional
She began her career as a professional basketball player playing for the New England Blizzard of the now defunct American Basketball League. During that time she was a two-time All-Star,  Rizzotti was a member of the Houston Comets after being drafted in 1999, and played for the Comets in 1999 and 2000.  The Comets won the League Championship both seasons. In 2001, she was traded to the Detroit Shock, but a month later, she was traded to the Cleveland Rockers. She played for the Cleveland Rockers from 2001 to 2003. Rizzotti was selected in the dispersal draft by the Detroit Shock in January 2004, but she retired from the WNBA.

Coaching
Rizzotti was recently the head basketball coach at George Washington University in Washington, D.C.  She previously spent 17 seasons as the head women's basketball coach at the University of Hartford where she led the Hawks to four America East Conference championships and six trips to the NCAA tournament.  She was named America East Coach of the Year in 2006, 2007, and 2010.  In 2010 Rizzotti guided Hartford to an undefeated regular season in the America East Conference and was one of the 10 finalists up for the Kay Yow Coach of the Year.

Rizzotti served as the head coach of the USA Basketball U18 team, at the 2010 FIBA Americas U18 Championship for Women in June 2010 at the U.S. Olympic Training Center in Colorado Springs CO.  She previously served as an assistant coach of the U18 team, assisting head coach Doug Bruno in 2006, when the team went 4–0 to win the gold medal.

In 2011, Rizzotti was named USA Basketball National Coach of the Year. She was the head coach for the USA U18 team, which won the gold medal at the 2010 FIBA Americas U18 Championship. She continued as head coach of the U19 team and guided the team to another gold medal at the FIBA U19 World Championship games held in Chile.

Hall of Fame
Rizzotti was inducted in the Women's Basketball Hall of Fame in June 2013. In her emotional acceptance speech she summarized, "I'm in the Hall of Fame because I played at the right school, at the right time with the right teammates, and I was taught to be a champion by the best coach who's ever coached the game." Her credentials included point guard on the 1995 National Championship team, and winner of the Wade Trophy and AP national player of the year award.

Personal life
Rizzotti grew up in New Fairfield, Connecticut and graduated from New Fairfield High School in 1992. She is the daughter of Tom and Carol Rizzotti.

Rizzotti was inducted into the Connecticut Women's Basketball Hall Of Fame in 2001.

Rizzotti married University of Hartford assistant Bill Sullivan in July 1999. The two welcomed their first child, Holden Thomas Sullivan, born .

Rizzotti was honored by her alma mater, the University of Connecticut, as the winner of the Red O'Neill Award, an award given annually to a former student athlete who has "gone on to distinguish themselves in their chosen career."

Rizzotti was honored by The University of Hartford in 2010 as commencement speaker. Additionally she received an honorary doctorate degree from the university.

University of Connecticut statistics

Head coaching record
Source:

See also
 List of Connecticut women's basketball players with 1000 points

Notes

References

External links

 Official Biography, George Washington Colonials
WNBA player profile

1974 births
Living people
All-American college women's basketball players
American women's basketball coaches
American women's basketball players
Basketball coaches from Connecticut
Basketball coaches from New York (state)
Basketball players from Connecticut
Basketball players from New York (state)
Cleveland Rockers players
George Washington Colonials women's basketball coaches
Hartford Hawks women's basketball coaches
Houston Comets players
New England Blizzard players
People from New Fairfield, Connecticut
People from White Plains, New York
Point guards
Sportspeople from Fairfield County, Connecticut
Sportspeople from Westchester County, New York
UConn Huskies women's basketball players